Frederick Juliand (born October 9, 1806 Greene, Chenango County, New York) was an American merchant and politician from New York.

Life
He was the son of Assemblyman Joseph Juliand, a French immigrant from Lyon who settled on a farm in the Town of Greene in 1798. Frederick Juliand became a merchant, and was Postmaster of Greene from 1849 to 1853.

He was a member of the New York State Assembly (Chenango Co., 2nd D.) in 1856 of the New York State Senate (23rd D.) in 1864 and 1865 and again of the State Assembly (Chenango Co.) in 1867 and 1868.

Sources
 The New York Civil List compiled by Franklin Benjamin Hough, Stephen C. Hutchins and Edgar Albert Werner (1870; pg. 443, 482, 506, 508)
 Life Sketches of the State Officers, Senators, and Members of the Assembly of the State of New York in 1867 by S. R. Harlow & H. H. Boone (pg. 282ff)

1806 births
Year of death missing
Republican Party New York (state) state senators
People from Greene, New York
Republican Party members of the New York State Assembly
New York (state) postmasters